Derince is a seaport, city and district of Kocaeli Province of Turkey. The mayor is Zeki Aygün (AK Parti).

Derince Port is one of the few ports in Turkey under government control. The port is operated by the Turkish State Railways (TCDD). Having one of the biggest storage area in the region, the port is widely used for finished vehicle product transportation. 

Derince is one of the few ports with railway connection in that area, and has the longest rail network within the port. Two rail ferry services use Derince Port, Tekirdağ-Derince operated by TCDD and Derince-Chornomorsk/Poti operated by Bati Wagon.   

The port is in the privatization list of Privatization Administration. The privatization process had restarted in October 2013. Six companies had offered for Derince Port, but the tender process was cancelled when none of them continued in thepublic auction.

Sport

The İzmit İsmetpaşa Stadium was located in Derince.

Derince Belediyespor Women's play in the Turkish Women's First Football League since the 2012–13 season. They finished the 2013–14 season in the third place.

Twin towns — sister cities
Derince is twinned with:

  Daegu, South Korea
  Formosa, Argentina, Argentina
  Yevpatoria, Ukraine

References

External links

Populated places in Kocaeli Province
Ports and harbours of the Sea of Marmara
Districts of Kocaeli Province